David Firth may refer to:

 David Firth (actor), English actor and writer
 David Firth (animator), creator of the British animated web series Salad Fingers
 David Firth (statistician), British statistician

See also
 David Frith, cricket writer and historian